Tobacco Cessation Clinic is an initiative by the World Health Organization (WHO) and the Ministry of Health of India. Tobacco cessation activities formally began with the opening of 13 tobacco cessation clinics in Anand, Bhopal, Bangalore, Chandigarh, Chennai, Cuttack, Delhi (2), Goa, Jaipur, Lucknow, Mumbai, and Patna in 2002. Tobacco cessation clinics were renamed to tobacco cessation centers in 2005. Five more tobacco cessation centers were established in Mizoram, Guwahati, Kolkata, Hyderabad and Trivandrum, which makes a total of 18 centers.

The services offered at the clinic include individual intervention in the form of behavioral counseling, medication, and nicotine replacement therapy. The centers also intend to create awareness among the general public about the negative effects of tobacco and about tobacco cessation through awareness programs, exhibitions training programs on tobacco cessation for various professionals, and information booklets and manuals aimed at specific groups of the population.

The Tobacco Cessation Clinic Resource Center (TCCRC), which is functioning in the National Institute of Mental Health and Neurosciences, (NIMHANS), Bangalore, is the national coordinating center for all the TCCs. The center in Bangalore runs an out patient clinic twice a week (Saturdays and Mondays) in the de-addiction OP section of the NIMHANS.

Locations

References

External links
Cancer Institute (Adyar Cancer Institute), Chennai
National Institute of Mental Health and Neurosciences (NIMHANS), Bangalore 
University Of Delhi, Delhi
Vallabhbhai Patel Chest Institute, Delhi
Regional Cancer Center, Thiruvananthapuram
Jawaharlal Nehru Cancer Hospital and Research centre idgah hills, Bhopal MP
Kerala Quit Smoking Institute

Smoking cessation
Smoking in India
Health programmes in India
Tobacco in India